The CollegeInsider.com Postseason Tournament (CIT) was an American men's college basketball postseason tournament founded by Collegeinsider.com. The tournament was oriented toward schools that did not get selected for the NCAA Division I men's basketball tournament or National Invitation Tournament (NIT).

The tournament was first contested in 2009. In 2012, it expanded to 32 participating teams, but contracted to 26 teams for the 2016, 2017, and 2019 editions, and 20 teams in 2018. The tournament was canceled in 2020 and 2021 due to the COVID-19 pandemic. In 2022, the tournament was re-launched and rebranded as The Basketball Classic.

Format
The tournament consists of five rounds, single elimination-style, and claims to "use the old NIT model in which matchups in future rounds are determined by the results of the previous round". Criteria for selection include, but are not limited to, win–loss record, strength of schedule, strength of conference, and final ten games. Teams from "major conferences" (defined by CollegeInsider.com as the Power Five conferences, Atlantic 10 Conference, American Athletic Conference, Big East Conference, Conference USA and Mountain West Conference) are generally ineligible. Participating teams must finish the regular season with a .500 winning percentage or better to qualify. The only exception to this was the now-defunct Great West Conference Tournament winner, who was given an automatic bid to play in the CIT if they were not given an at-large bid to participate in the NCAA or NIT tournaments, until the dissolution of the conference in 2013–14.  In 2013, the Chicago State Cougars won the Great West Conference Tournament, thus becoming the first team to participate in the CIT with a sub-.500 record (11–21). From the 2016 Tournament to 2019, The Coach John McLendon Classic is played on the first day of the tournament. The Classic will feature at least one historically black college/university. The winner of the John McLendon Classic will advance to the second round of the CIT.  This has been the first time in NCAA Division I Basketball history that a "Classic" has been part of a postseason tournament. Previously the John McLendon Classic was played during the regular season.

Teams must pay $30,000 to host a game.

Broadcast
In 2013, CBS Sports Network partnered with the CIT, showing only the championship game, with the earlier rounds streamed live online. Free registration is required to view the games. Starting in 2014, CBSSN aired the semifinals and the championship game. In 2017 the early rounds of the tournament were shown on Facebook Live. In 2018 Monday's 4 classics were announced for CBSSN. All remaining games until the semifinals were moved to CBS' Sports Live streaming service and watchcit.com.

The following is an overview and list of the announcers and television networks to broadcast the CIT:

Champions

References

External links
 
 CIT record book

 
Recurring sporting events established in 2009
Recurring sporting events disestablished in 2019
College men's basketball competitions in the United States
Postseason college basketball competitions in the United States